Sarab Bagh District is a district (bakhsh) in Abdanan County, Ilam Province, Iran. At the 2006 census, its population was 10,102, in 2,030 families.  The District has one city: Sarab Bagh. The District has two rural districts (dehestan): Cham Kabud Rural District and Sarab Bagh Rural District.

References 

Districts of Ilam Province
Abdanan County